Germany competed at the 1992 Summer Paralympics in Barcelona, Spain. 238 competitors from Germany won 171 medals including 61 gold, 51 silver and 59 bronze and finished 2nd in the medal table.

Medalists

Gold medalists

Silver medalists

Bronze medalists

See also 
 Germany at the Paralympics
 Germany at the 1992 Summer Olympics

References 

Nations at the 1992 Summer Paralympics
1992
1992 in German sport